The Living Coffin (Spanish: El grito de la muerte/ Scream of Death) is a 1959 Mexican Western horror film focusing on a ranch haunted by evil spirits.  It incorporates the story of La Llorona (The Crying Woman).

Plot

Cast 
 Gastón Santos as Gastón / Cowboy
 María Duval as María Elena García
 Pedro de Aguillón as Coyote Loco
 Carlos Anciraa as Felipe
 Carolina Barret as Clotilde
 Antonio Raxel as Doctor
 Hortensia Santoveña as Doña María
 Quintín Bulnes as Indio

Release 
The Living Coffin was released on DVD in April 2007.

Reception 
Bloody Disgusting rated it 3.5/5 stars and called it "an enjoyable—if somewhat dusty romp—through Mexico’s version of the old west."  Bill Gibron of DVD Verdict wrote, "Though its mixture of horror and horse opera never quite succeeds, The Living Coffin is still an enjoyable example of Mexican madness. It may not give you the shivers, but it won't directly disappoint you either."  Todd Brown of Twitch Film wrote, "The Living Coffin succeeds because it knows exactly what kind of film it is: this is pure b-film pulp."  Glenn Erickson of DVD Talk wrote, "The film may not be scary, but it is occasionally funny."

References

External links 
 

1959 films
1959 horror films
1950s Western (genre) horror films
1950s Spanish-language films
Mexican Western (genre) horror films
1950s ghost films
1950s Mexican films